Bursaspor Basketbol, also known as Frutti Extra Bursaspor for sponsorship reasons, is a Turkish professional basketball club based in Bursa. Founded in 2014, the club is the basketball section of the multi-sport club Bursaspor and currently competes in the Basketbol Süper Ligi, the top-tier basketball league in Turkey.

History
Bursaspor Basketbol was founded in 2014 and entered the Third Turkish League. In 2019, Bursaspor promoted to the Basketbol Süper Ligi (BSL), for the first time after winning the Turkish Second Division championship. In the 2019–20 Basketbol Süper Ligi, Bursaspor performed well until the season was cancelled due to the COVID-19 pandemic. After finishing ninth in the standings, the team will play in the 2020–21 EuroCup Basketball. This will be the European debut of the team.

Sponsorship names
 Bursaspor Durmazlar: 2016–2019
 Frutti Extra Bursaspor: 2019–present

Players

Current roster

Depth chart

Notable past players
  Anthony Brown
  Xavier Munford

Honours
Turkish Basketball First League
 Winners (1): 2018–19
EuroCup
 Runner up (1): 2021–22

Season by season

 Cancelled due to the COVID-19 pandemic in Europe.

References

External links
  
 Official Twitter account
 TBLStat.net profile
 Eurobasket.com profile

Basketball teams in Turkey
Bursaspor
Basketball teams established in 2014